The Girls Aloud Party was a one-off Christmas variety show starring British girl group Girls Aloud, produced for ITV. The show was aired on 13 December 2008, in between The X Factor series finale and its results show.

All five members took part in the show, which generally consisted of the group performing songs, intercepted sketches and interaction with the audience.

Background
Girls Aloud performed some of their biggest hits, as well as some tracks from their latest album, Out of Control. James Morrison performed his track "Broken Strings" with Girls Aloud, while Kaiser Chiefs led into "Sound of the Underground" with their own track, "Never Miss a Beat". Along with performing, Girls Aloud performed comic skits in which Cilla Black and Julie Goodyear starred as Nicola Roberts's grandmother and Sarah Harding's mother.

Promotion
On 11 November, the official Girls Aloud website ran a competition in which 100 entrants would win tickets to the show. The show was filmed in London on 2 December, as stated by the announcement.

The programme was first advertised during The X Factor on 29 November 2008.

Reception
The Girls Aloud Party had approximately 8.37 million viewers (32.3%).

Cast
Girls Aloud
 Sarah Harding
 Kimberley Walsh
 Cheryl Cole
 Nicola Roberts
 Nadine Coyle

Special guests
 Paul O'Grady
 Cilla Black
 Julie Goodyear as Sarah’s Mum

Guest performers
 James Morrison
 Kaiser Chiefs

Setlist
 Intro Video: "Love Is The Key" (Thriller Jill Mix)
 "The Promise"
 Christmas Sketch (with Paul O'Grady)
 "Call the Shots"
 Memories Sketch (with Little Girls Aloud)
 "I'll Stand by You"
 Mothers Sketch (with Little Girls Aloud & Cilla Black)
 Medley: "Never Miss a Beat"/"Sound of the Underground" (with Kaiser Chiefs)
 "Love Machine" (contains dance break)
 Dress Sketch (with Julie Goodyear)
 "Broken Strings" (with James Morrison)
 Christmas Card Sketch
 "Love Is Pain"
 "The Loving Kind"
 Old Girls Aloud Sketch
 "Something Kinda Ooooh"

References

External links
 

2008 television specials
British music television shows
British television specials
Girls Aloud television shows
ITV (TV network) original programming
Music television specials
Television series by ITV Studios